Override 2: Super Mech League is a mech-fighting video game developed by Modus Studios Brazil (formerly The Balance, Inc.) and published by Modus Games. It was released for Xbox One, Xbox Series X/S, PlayStation 4, PlayStation 5, Nintendo Switch and Microsoft Windows on December 22, 2020. It is a sequel to the 2018 game, Override: Mech City Brawl.

Gameplay
The gameplay has been revamped and had major changes introduced. This includes the ability to now lift and throw your opponents, new attacks for each mech and more fast pace combat. The game no longer has a set story mode as the first game did. Instead, it now focuses on the player moving up the ranks in league matches and unlocking the garage through the leagues.

There are still different multiplayer modes and offline matches that allows players to fight, team up or fight different mechs with up to four players at one time. The gameplay mechanics and league mode seem to be inspired by the direct-to-mobile game, Real Steel and older established titles like Godzilla: Save the Earth.

Mechs 
The same mechs from the first game return although with the addition of new mechs such as:

 Atlas
 Aura
 Bellona
 Cocada
 Contessa
 Crystal
 Maestro
 Megaton
 Metageckon
 Mya
 Pescado
 Rocca
 Setesh
 Shifu
 Sprinkles
 Stardust
 Toasty
 Vidar
 Vintage
 Watchbot

There is also an Ultraman Deluxe Edition of the game which adds Ultraman, Bemular, Black King, and Ultraseven.

Reception
Upon its release, Override 2: Super Mech League was met with "mixed or average reviews" according to video game review aggregator Metacritic, with aggregate scores of 63/100 on all platforms.

References

External links
en

PlayStation 5 games
2020 video games
3D fighting games
Video games about mecha
Multiplayer and single-player video games
Nintendo Switch games
PlayStation 4 games
Windows games
Xbox One games
Video games developed in Brazil
Xbox Series X and Series S games
Video game sequels